The Montoursville Area School District is a small, rural public school district in Lycoming County. The district serves the borough of Montoursville, plus the townships of Fairfield, Upper Fairfield, Eldred, Gamble, Cascade, and Plunketts Creek. According to 2000 federal census data, it serves a resident population of 13,512. By 2010, the US Census Bureau reported the district's population declined to 13,209 people. The educational attainment levels for the Montoursville Area School District population (25 years old and over) were 92% high school graduates and 22.8% college graduates.

Montoursville Area School District operates two elementary schools, C E Mccall Middle School and Montoursville Area High School. High school students may choose to attend Lycoming County Career and Technical Center for training in the construction and mechanical trades. The BLaST Intermediate Unit IU17 provides the district with a wide variety of services like specialized education for disabled students and hearing, speech and visual disability services and professional development for staff and faculty.

Extracurriculars

The Montoursville Area School District offers a wide variety of clubs, activities and an extensive, publicly funded sports program.

The sports programs are associated with the Pennsylvania Heartland Athletic Conference and the Pennsylvania Interscholastic Athletic Association. The Pennsylvania Heartland Athletic Conference is a voluntary association of 25 PIAA High Schools within the central Pennsylvania region.

Sports
The district funds:

Varsity

Boys
Baseball - AAA
Basketball- AAA
Cross country - AA
Football - AAA
Golf - AA
Soccer - AA
Swimming and diving - AA
Tennis - AA
Track and field - AA
Wrestling - AA

Girls
Basketball - AA
Cross country - AA
Golf - AA
Soccer - AA
Softball - AA
Swimming and diving - AAA
Tennis - AA
Track and field - AA

Middle school sports

Boys
Basketball
Cross country
Football
Soccer
Wrestling 

Girls
Basketball
Cross country
Softball

According to PIAA directory July 2013

References

External links

 BLaST Intermediate Unit

School districts in Lycoming County, Pennsylvania
Susquehanna Valley